In the sport of association football, fouls and misconduct are acts committed by players which are deemed by the referee to be unfair and are subsequently penalised. An offence may be a foul, misconduct or both depending on the nature of the offence and the circumstances in which it occurs. Fouls and misconduct are addressed in Law 12 of the Laws of the Game.

A foul is an unfair act by a player, deemed by the referee to contravene the game's laws, that interferes with the active play of the game. Fouls are punished by the award of a free kick (possibly a penalty kick) to the opposing team. A list of specific offences that can be fouls are detailed in Law 12 of the Laws of the Game (other infractions, such as technical infractions at restarts, are not deemed to be fouls); these mostly concern unnecessarily aggressive physical play and the offence of handling the ball. An infringement is classified as a foul when it meets all the following conditions:
 It is committed by a player (not a substitute);
 It occurs on the field of play;
 It occurs while the ball is in play;
 It is committed against an opponent (for fouls concerning contact or conduct between players).

For example, a player striking the referee or a teammate is not a foul, but is misconduct.

Misconduct is any conduct by a player that is deemed by the referee to warrant a disciplinary sanction (caution or dismissal). Misconduct may include acts which are, additionally, fouls. Unlike fouls, misconduct may occur at any time, including when the ball is out of play, during half-time and before and after the game, and both players and substitutes may be sanctioned for misconduct.

Misconduct will result in the player either receiving a caution (indicated by a yellow card) or being dismissed ("sent off") from the field (indicated by a red card). A dismissed player cannot be replaced; their team is required to play the remainder of the game with one less player. A second caution results in the player being dismissed. The referee has considerable discretion in applying the Laws; in particular, the offence of unsporting behaviour may be used to deal with most events that violate the spirit of the game, even if they are not listed as specific offences.

The system of cautioning and dismissal has existed in the Laws since 1881. Association football was the first sport to introduce penalty cards to indicate the referee's decisions; a practice since adopted by many other sports. The first major use of the cards was in the 1970 FIFA World Cup, but they were not made mandatory at all levels until 1992.

Categories of foul
The rules divide fouls into two categories depending on the type of free kick awarded to the opposition, either a direct or indirect free kick.

Direct free kick offences

Direct free kicks offences are the more common type of foul. If a direct free kick is awarded in the penalty area of the offending player's team, a penalty kick is awarded.

The majority of fouls concern contact between opponents. Although contact between players is a part of the game, the Laws prohibit most forceful contact, meaning that, unlike other football codes, a tackle in association football is required to be predominantly directed against the ball rather than the player in possession of it. Specifically the rules prohibit charging, jumping at, kicking (or attempting to kick), pushing, striking (or attempting to strike), tripping (or attempting to trip), and rugby-style tackling an opponent in a manner considered to be careless, reckless or "using excessive force". Being careless makes it an offence, being reckless makes it a cautionable offence and using excessive force makes it a sending-off offence. Such classification of contact is a matter of judgement for the referee.

The handball offence is also penalised with a direct free kick. Players in association football are prohibited from touching the ball below the shoulder while the ball is in play, with the exception of the goalkeeper in their penalty area. When determining a handball offence, not every touch of the player's hand/arm to the ball is an offence. The area of the arm in line with the bottom of the armpit and above is allowed to touch the ball. Unavoidable accidental contact is not penalised - such as if the ball is struck against a player's arm at short range and the player could not have reasonably avoided the contact. However if the player has positioned their arm so as to make their body "unnaturally bigger" and contact occurs, this is considered handball. Additionally, if a player scores in the opponent's goal with their hand or arm, even if accidental and unavoidable, this is considered handball and the goal does not stand. The goalkeeper also has the same rules regarding handballs outside of the penalty area. If the goalkeeper handles the ball inside the penalty area when not allowed to do so, an indirect free kick is awarded. 

Direct free kicks are also awarded for holding an opponent, impeding them with contact, biting or spitting at other persons, throwing an object (other than the ball) at an opponent or match official, or making contact with the ball with a held object.

Indirect free kick offences
An indirect free kick is awarded if a player:

plays in a dangerous manner
impedes the progress of an opponent without any contact being made
is guilty of dissent, using offensive, insulting or abusive language and/or action(s) or other verbal offences
prevents the goalkeeper from releasing the ball from their hands or kicks or attempts to kick the ball when the goalkeeper is in the process of releasing it
initiates a deliberate trick for the ball to be passed (including from a free kick or goal kick) to the goalkeeper with the head, chest, knee etc. to circumvent the back-pass rule, whether or not the goalkeeper touches the ball with their hands; the goalkeeper is penalised if responsible for initiating the deliberate trick
commits any other offence, not previously mentioned in the Laws, for which play is stopped to caution or send off a player

An indirect free kick is awarded if a goalkeeper, inside their penalty area, commits any of the following offences:

controls the ball with their hands for more than six seconds before releasing it from possession
touches the ball again with their hands after releasing it from possession and before it has touched another player
touches the ball with their hands after it has been deliberately kicked to them by a team-mate, or thrown to them from a throw-in taken by a team-mate (the back-pass rule)

An indirect free kick is also awarded if an offside offence occurs, though offside is not considered a foul and will never be punished by a caution or dismissal.

Indirect free kicks are taken from the place where the offence occurred, even if it was inside the offending player's penalty area. If the offence took place inside their goal area the indirect free kick is taken from the nearest point on the goal area line which runs parallel to the goal line.

Other offences
Not all infractions of the Laws are fouls. Non-foul infractions may be dealt with as technical infractions (e.g. as breaching the rules governing the restarts of play) or misconduct (these are punishable by a caution or sending-off). Note that persistent infringement of the Laws is an offence for which the player may be cautioned.

Misconduct
 

The referee may consider serious or persistent offences to be misconduct worthy of an official caution or dismissal from the game. Association football was the first sport to use coloured cards to indicate these actions.

Yellow card (caution)

A yellow card is shown by the referee to indicate that a player has been officially cautioned. The player's details are then recorded by the referee in a small notebook; hence a caution is also known as a "booking". A player who has been cautioned may continue playing in the game; however, a player who receives a second caution in a match is sent off (shown the yellow card again, and then a red card). Law 12 of the Laws of the Game lists the types of offences and misconduct that may result in a caution. Players can be cautioned and shown a yellow card if they commit the following offences: 
Dissent by word or action
Persistent infringement of the Laws of the Game
Delaying the restart of play
Failure to respect the required distance when play is restarted with a corner kick, throw-in or free kick
Entering or re-entering the field of play without the referee's permission
Deliberately leaving the field of play without the referee's permission
Unsporting behaviour (a broad category of caution-worthy acts, see below)

There are also two offences which apply in matches using the video assistant referee system:

Entering the referee review area
Excessively using the "review" (TV screen) hand gesture

What constitutes cautionable unsporting behaviour is generally at the referee's discretion, though Law 12 lists a number of examples. These include simulation intended to deceive the referee, or attempting to score by handling the ball. Fouls which are committed recklessly or fouls which are committed with the intention of breaking up a promising attack are also considered unsporting behaviour and punishable with a yellow card. Fouls which are committed with excessive force, however, or which are deliberately committed to deny an obvious goalscoring opportunity for the player fouled (i.e. a professional foul), are punishable by a red card.

The Laws state that goals may be celebrated, but that such celebrations should not be "excessive". Removing one's shirt or covering  one's face with the shirt will result in a caution. Players may also be cautioned for climbing onto a perimeter fence or approaching/entering spectator areas in a manner that causes safety and/or security concerns.

In most tournaments, the accumulation of a certain number of yellow cards over several matches results in a suspension of the offending player for a certain number of subsequent matches, the exact number of cards and matches varying by jurisdiction. In the UEFA Champions League, for instance, accumulating two yellow cards in a stage of the tournament will lead to a one-game suspension. In such situations players have often been suspected of (and occasionally even admitted to) deliberately incurring a second booking in a tournament when the following game is of little importance, thus resetting their yellow card tally to zero for subsequent games (known as "cleaning cards"). However, while technically within the rules of competition, this is considered unsportsmanlike and UEFA have on occasion threatened additional fines and or suspensions to the players and managers involved.

In 2017 IFAB approved temporary dismissals (sin-bins) for cautionable offences similar to that seen in other sports; however, this is only permitted for youth, veterans, disability and grassroots football. Competitions' use of this system—rather than normal yellow cards—is optional, and there are variations in how it can be implemented. For 90-minute games, the length of the temporary dismissal is 10 minutes.

Red card (dismissal)

A red card is shown by a referee to signify that a player must be sent off. A player who has been sent off is required to leave the field of play immediately, must take no further part in the game and cannot be replaced by a substitute, forcing their team to play with one fewer player. If a team's goalkeeper receives a red card another player is required to assume goalkeeping duties, so teams usually substitute another goalkeeper for an outfield player if they still have substitutes available.

Law 12 of the Laws of the Game lists the categories of misconduct for which a player may be sent off. These are:

 denying an obvious goalscoring opportunity with a handball (this does not apply to a goalkeeper within their penalty area)
 denying an obvious goalscoring opportunity with a foul (unless the referee awards a penalty and it was an attempt to play the ball)
 serious foul play
 violent conduct
 using offensive, insulting or abusive language and/or action(s)
 receiving a second yellow card (caution) in the same match

In matches using the Video Assistant Referee system, the list also includes:

 entering the video operation room (VOR)

Serious foul play is a foul committed using excessive force (i.e., "the player has far exceeded the necessary use of force and is in danger of injuring his opponent when challenging for the ball and when it is in play."). Violent conduct is distinct from serious foul play in that it may be committed by any player, substitute, or substituted player against any person, e.g., teammates, match officials, or spectators.

Once a player has been sent off, they are not permitted to stay in the team's technical area and must leave the immediate field or playing area.

In most tournaments, a single direct red card (i.e. not one received as a result of two successive yellow ones) results in disqualification of the offending player for one or more subsequent matches, with the exact number of matches varying by the offence committed and by jurisdiction.

Should a team's on-field players receive a total of 5 red cards, it will be unable to field the required minimum of 7 players, resulting in the game being abandoned.

Starting in August 2020 amid the COVID-19 pandemic, IFAB and the Football Association stated that any player who deliberately coughs at others will receive a straight red card. Less severe incidents are classified as "unsporting behaviour" and will result in a yellow card.

History and origin

The practice of cautioning and excluding players who make serious breaches of the rules has been part of the Laws of the Game since 1881.
However, the practice of using language-neutral coloured cards to indicate these actions did not follow for almost 90 years.

The idea originated with British football referee Ken Aston. Aston had been appointed to the FIFA Referees' Committee and was responsible for all referees at the 1966 FIFA World Cup. In the quarter finals, England met Argentina at Wembley Stadium. After the match, newspaper reports stated that referee Rudolf Kreitlein had cautioned both Bobby and Jack Charlton, as well as sending off Argentine Antonio Rattín. The referee had not made his decision clear during the game, and England manager Alf Ramsey approached FIFA for post-match clarification. This incident started Aston thinking about ways to make a referee's decisions clearer to both players and spectators. Aston realised that a colour-coding scheme based on the same principle as used on traffic lights (yellow - caution, red - stop) would traverse language barriers and clarify whether a player had been cautioned or expelled. As a result, yellow cards to indicate a caution and red cards to indicate an expulsion were used for the first time in the 1970 FIFA World Cup in Mexico (though no players were sent off in that tournament). The use of penalty cards has since been adopted and expanded by several sporting codes, with each sport adapting the idea to its specific set of rules or laws.

Until 1992, a player committing a second bookable offence was shown only a red card; in that year, the IFAB mandated that a yellow card be shown before the red card. Lothar Matthäus had previously proposed a "lilac card" to distinguish such cases from the more serious "straight red card" offence.

Frequency
Fouls are fairly common occurrences in games. For example, the 2012–13 football season saw fouls-per-game rates in the major European leagues ranging from 23 in the 2012–13 Premier League to 32 in the Bundesliga.

Yellow cards are less common, though a typical game will feature a few – at the 2014 FIFA World Cup there were, on average, about three cautions per game. Dismissals are much rarer; that same tournament saw an average of 0.2 red cards per match.

Referee's discretion
The referee has a very large degree of discretion as to the enforcement of the 17 Laws including determining which acts constitute cautionable offences under the very broad categories. For this reason, refereeing decisions are sometimes controversial. Some Laws may specify circumstances under which a caution should or must be given, and numerous directives to referees also provide additional guidance. The encouragement for referees to use their common sense is known colloquially as "Law 18".

Advantage

According to the principle of advantage, play should be allowed to continue when an offence occurs and the non-offending team will benefit from ongoing play. If the anticipated advantage does not ensue within a few seconds, the referee will stop play and restart with a direct or indirect free kick or a penalty kick (depending on the offence).

Restarts
If the ball is out of play when an infraction of the Laws of the Game occurs, play is restarted according to the reason the ball became out of play before the infraction. (Any infraction of the Laws of the Game that occurs while the ball is out of play can be misconduct, but is not a foul.)

If the misconduct occurs when the ball is in play, play need not be stopped to administer a caution or a dismissal, as these may be done at the next stoppage of play (this is usually the case when the opposing team would gain an advantage in having play continue). When this is the case, play is restarted according to the reason for the ball becoming out of play, e.g. a throw-in if play stopped due to the ball crossing a touchline.

If play is stopped to administer a caution or dismissal:
 If a foul has occurred as well as misconduct, play is restarted according to the nature of the offence (either an indirect free kick, direct free kick or penalty kick to the opposing team)
 If no foul under Law 12 has occurred, play is restarted with an indirect free kick to the opposing team

Team officials
Team officials such as managers and coaches are not subject to the cautionable and sending-off offences listed above, as these apply only to players, substitutes, and substituted players. However, according to Law 5 the referee can caution or dismiss team officials from their technical areas and immediate surroundings. In 2019 the IFAB approved the use of red and yellow cards for team officials.

The league sanction for a sent-off coach or manager is normally a ban from being in the dugout or in the changing room for a certain number of matches thereafter. The particular football association determines the length of the ban and/or other appropriate action.

Post-match penalties
Many football leagues and federations impose off-field penalties for players who accumulate a certain number of cautions in a season, tournament or phase of a tournament. Typically, these take the form of suspending a player from playing in his team's next game(s) after reaching a particular number of cautions. Such off-field penalties are determined by league rules, and not by the Laws of the Game. A unique rule regarding this penalty was introduced by Major League Soccer in its reserve league of MLS Next Pro at the halfway point of Next Pro's inaugural 2022 season. A player who is sent off serves his suspension in his team's next match against the same opponent.

Similarly, a direct red card usually also results in additional sanctions, most commonly in the form of suspensions from playing for a number of future games, although financial fines may also be imposed. The exact punishments are determined by tournament or competition rules, and not by the Laws of the Game. FIFA in particular has been adamant that a red card in any football competition must result in the guilty player being suspended for at least the next game, with the only grounds of appeal being mistaken identity.

At the 2006 FIFA World Cup, any player receiving two yellow cards during the three group stage matches, or two yellow cards in the knockout stage matches had to serve a one-match suspension for the next game. A single yellow card did not carry over from the group stage to the knockout stages. Should the player pick up his second yellow during the team's final group match, he would miss the Round of 16 if his team qualified for it. However, suspensions due to yellow cards do not carry beyond the World Cup finals.

For the 2010 FIFA World Cup, the rules were changed so that any player who received two yellow cards between the beginning of the tournament and the end of the quarterfinal round (instead of the end of the group stage matches) would serve a one-match suspension for the next game. As a result, only players that received a red card (whether directly or after a second booking) in the semifinal game would not be able to play in the final.

In some league/group competitions, a team's fair play record, as measured by the total number of yellow and red cards acquired by a team, may be used as a potential tie-breaking method to determine final table position.

See also
Laws of the Game (association football)

References

External links
Q&A: So what makes a bad tackle?, BBC Sport website, 24 September 2012
The Junior Games - Catching Misconduct, a 10-year story, Tableau Public website, June 2016

Laws of association football
Association football terminology
Misconduct